The 1992 Wellington City mayoral election was part of the held that same year. In 1992, elections were held for the Mayor of Wellington plus other local government roles including 21 councillors. The polling was conducted using the standard first-past-the-post electoral method.

The election saw Fran Wilde, the MP for Wellington Central, elected as the new mayor of Wellington replacing incumbent Sir Jim Belich who had retired after serving two terms. Wilde became Wellington's first female mayor, defeating former Deputy Mayor Helene Ritchie and her predecessor as MP for Wellington Central Ken Comber who ran for the Citizens' Association.

Background
The Citizens' Association made a surprise choice in their candidate for mayor. The association selection panel chose former National Party MP Ken Comber as its candidate ahead of the Citizens' leader on the council Les Stephens. Also vying for the nomination were Eastern Ward councillor Ruth Gotlieb, former councillor Bryan Weyburne and previous mayor Ian Lawrence. Gotlieb ran for mayor regardless unsuccessfully, but was re-elected in the Eastern Ward as an independent. Weyburne was elected to the Western Ward and Lawrence to the Regional Council while Stephens was defeated in the Onslow Ward.

Following Jim Belich's decision to retire from the mayoralty, the Labour Party chose Wellington Central MP Fran Wilde as their candidate. Initially Eastern Ward councillor Nic Dalton was favoured to replace Belich though Dalton ruled himself out of contention for both the mayoralty and council. Attention then turned to Wilde's status as an MP with the prospect of her taking both a parliamentary and mayoral salary or the prospect of a by-election at taxpayer expense. Labour leader Mike Moore made known his preference for Wilde to remain in Parliament, offering to relieve her of portfolios to help with workload, although Wilde ultimately decided to resign from Parliament if elected mayor.

Results
The following table gives the election results:

Results by ward
Fran Wilde polled the highest in all seven of Wellington's electoral wards.

Ward results

Candidates were also elected from wards to the Wellington City Council.

See also
1992 Wellington Central by-election

References

Mayoral elections in Wellington
1992 elections in New Zealand
Politics of the Wellington Region
1990s in Wellington